The Augusta Daily Gazette was an American daily newspaper in Augusta, Kansas. It was owned by GateHouse Media.

The paper covered several communities in suburban Butler County, Kansas, part of the Wichita metropolitan area. In addition to Augusta, the Gazette coverage area includes Andover, Douglass, Leon, Towanda and Rose Hill.

GateHouse has since merged the Gazette with the Andover American and The El Dorado Times. The new publication is called the Butler County Times-Gazette.

See also
 List of newspapers in Kansas

References

External links
 

Newspapers published in Kansas
Butler County, Kansas
Mass media in Wichita, Kansas
Publications established in 1902
1902 establishments in Kansas